Jeremy Silman (born August 28, 1954) is an American International Master (IM) of chess and writer. Silman was born in Del Rio, Texas. He began playing chess at the age of 12. He has won the American Open, the National Open, and the U.S. Open, and was the coach of the US junior national chess team. He attained the IM title in 1988.

Silman has written over 35 books, mostly on chess but also on casino gambling, and has written articles for chess magazines such as Chess Life and New in Chess. He has also written many chess mentoring puzzles on the chess.com website.

Silman is the professor in a video chess course produced by The Teaching Company as part of its Great Courses series.

Silman served as a chess consultant on the 2001 Harry Potter film Harry Potter and the Philosopher's Stone, Monk, and Malcolm in the Middle. However, Silman was uncredited for his work on Harry Potter and the Philosopher's Stone.

Silman is also said to have been involved in the Haight-Ashbury scene in the 1970s. The preface to his Endgame Course mentions this, and fellow chess players Daniel King and Ronan Bennett allude to this in a newspaper column from 2007.

Strategy of imbalances
In his books, Silman evaluates positions according to the "imbalances", or differences, which exist in every position, and advocates that players plan their play according to these. A good plan according to Silman is one which highlights the positive imbalances in the position. The imbalances are, in rough descending order of importance according to Dana Mackenzie:
Superior minor piece, which refers to the relative strength of the knights and bishops
Pawn structure
Spatial control
Material; in his Chess Life series The Art of Planning, Silman called this the most important imbalance because it affected every phase of the game;
Control of open files, diagonals, and squares
Development
Initiative; Silman notes that this (along with superior development) is a dynamic imbalance that must be used quickly if the advantage is not to fade away

Silman's thinking technique
Silman proposes in How to Reassess Your Chess a five-fold procedure that he recommends that players use. This procedure is to be followed after checking for tactical threats for both sides.
 Figure out the positive and negative imbalances for both sides.
 Figure out the side of the board you wish to play on. You can only play when a favourable imbalance or the possibility of creating a favourable imbalance exists. 
 Don't calculate! Instead, dream up various fantasy positions, i.e., the positions you would most like to achieve.
 Once you find a fantasy position that makes you happy, you must figure out if you can reach it. If you find that your choice was not possible to implement, you must create another dream position that is easier to achieve. 
 Only now do you look at the moves you wish to calculate (called candidate moves). The candidate moves are all the moves that lead to our dream position.

Books
 Autobiography of a Goat, 2013, 252 pages, Maelstrom Press, .
 How to Reassess your Chess (4th edition): Chess Mastery through Chess Imbalances, 2010, 658 pages, Siles Press, .
 Silman's Complete Endgame Course: From Beginner To Master, 2007, 530 pages, Siles Press, .
 Pal Benko: My Life, Games and Compositions, with Pal Benko and John L. Watson, 2004, 520 pages, Siles Press, . 
 Gambits in the Slav with William John Donaldson, 2003, 160 pages, Chess Enterprises, .
 The Reassess your Chess Workbook: How to Master Chess Imbalances, 2001, 400 pages, Siles Press, .
 The Amateur's Mind (2nd edition): Turning Chess Misconceptions into Chess Mastery, 1999, 443 pages, Siles Press, .
 Accelerated Dragons (2nd edition) with William John Donaldson, 1998, 320 pages, Everyman Chess, . 
 The Complete Book of Chess Strategy: Grandmaster Techniques from A to Z, 1998, 360 pages, Siles Press, . 
 Winning with the Sicilian Defense (2nd edition): A Complete Repertoire against 1.e4, 1998, 353 pages, Chess Digest, . 
 Essential Chess Endings Explained Move by Move Volume One: Novice thru Intermediate, 1992, 223 pages, Chess Digest, .
 The Dynamic Caro-Kann: The Bronstein Larsen and the Original Caro System, 1990, 182 pages, Summit Publishing, .
 A Complete Black Repertoire, 1986, 126 pages, Chess Digest, .

References

External links

 Personal web page
 Chess Position  from Harry Potter and the Sorcerer's Stone. Reconstructed in a YouTube video.
 Profile on chess.com
"How+To"+Courses_18_0 Silman's courses on The Great Courses

1954 births
Living people
20th-century American Jews
American chess players
Jewish chess players
Chess International Masters
Chess coaches
American non-fiction writers
American chess writers
American male non-fiction writers
People from Del Rio, Texas
Jews and Judaism in Texas
21st-century American Jews